John Boyd (21 April 1881 – 1927) was a Scottish footballer who played in the Football League for Bolton Wanderers.

References

1881 births
1927 deaths
Scottish footballers
English Football League players
Association football midfielders
Bolton Wanderers F.C. players
Plymouth Argyle F.C. players
Accrington Stanley F.C. (1891) players